Rufino Inglés (10 November 1902 – 2 November 1981) was a Spanish actor.

He appeared in La novia de Juan Lucero (1959), Salto a la gloria, and Dio perdona... io no!. He also appeared in Balboa (1963), Goliath Against the Giants (1961),  Tombs of the Blind Dead (1972), and Juicio final (1955).

Selected filmography

 La virgen de cristal (1926)
 El tonto de Lagartera (1927)
 La calumnia (1928)
 El gordo de navidad (1929)
 El nocturno de Chopin (1932)
 Water in the Ground (1934) as Poli Vilaredo
 Paloma de mis amores (1936)
 Jai-Alai (1940)
 Oro vil (1941)
 ¡A mí la legión! (1942) as Capitán Romero
 El triunfo del amor (1943)
 Tarjeta de visita (1944) as Martín Fernández
 El pozo de los enamorados (1945)
 La tempestad (1945)
 Chantaje (1946)
 Alma canaria (1947)
 Héroes del 95 (1947) as Sargento
 El huésped del cuarto número 13 (1947)
 Dos mujeres y un rostro (1947)
 Aventuras de don Juan de Mairena (1948) as Fernando
 El huésped de las tinieblas (1948)
 Las aguas bajan negras (1948) as Sargeant
 La calle sin sol (1948)
 Jalisco canta en Sevilla (1949)
 Loyola, the Soldier Saint (1949)
 La manigua sin dios (1949)
 Siempre vuelven de madrugada (1949) as Paco
 ¡El santuario no se rinde! (1949) as Comandante rojo (uncredited)
 Aventuras de Juan Lucas (1949) as Cojo
 Paz (1949)
 El duende y el rey (1950)
 La sombra iluminada (1950) as Inspector
 Murió hace quince años (1954) as Segundo agente en El Escorial (uncredited)
 La reina mora (1955) as Hombre en feria (uncredited)
 La otra vida del capitán Contreras (1955) as Hombre ballando en habitación
 Marcelino pan y vino (1955) as Council Member
 El indiano (1955)
 Coyote (1955)
 Death of a Cyclist (1955) as Nico
 El tren expreso (1955)
 Orgullo (1955)
 Suspenso en comunismo (1956) as Viajero del autobús
 Tarde de toros (1956) as Amigo 3º
 La gran mentira (1956) as Recepcionista
 La espera (1956)
 Curra Veleta (1956) as Recepcionista hotel
 La mestiza (1956)
 Pasión en el mar (1956) as patrón del San Juan
 Río Guadalquivir (1957)
 Susana y yo (1957)
 Maravilla (1957) as Escocés
 Tremolina (1957) as Oficial de aduanas
 El hombre que viajaba despacito (1957) as Jugador de cartas
 Un abrigo a cuadros (1957) as Ángel
 La hija de Juan Simón (1957) as Director sesión fotográfica
 Fulano y Mengano (1957)
 Aquellos tiempos del cuplé (1958)
 La violetera (1958)
 Héroes del aire (1958) as Comandante
 La venganza (1958) as Amo 1
 Caravana de esclavos (1958) as Abu el Mot's Man in Charge (uncredited)
 Secretaria para todo (1958)
 Habanera (1958)
 Canto para ti (1959) as Presidente de la fiesta
 Honeymoon (1959) as Customs Agent
 La novia de Juan Lucero (1959)
 Salto a la gloria (1959)
 Venta de Vargas (1959)
 Sonatas (1959) as Doctor
 Una gran señora (1959) as Tipo del bar
 La vida alrededor (1959) as Policía que detiene a Ceferino
 S.O.S., abuelita (1959)
 Un hecho violento (1959) as Preso (uncredited)
 Tenemos 18 años (1959) as Jefe indio
 Juicio final (1960)
 El amor que yo te di (1960)
 El Litri y su sombra (1960) as Amigo del viejo Litri (uncredited)
 El hombre que perdió el tren (1960)
 Crimen para recién casados (1960) as Padre de Elisa
 Ama Rosa (1960)
 La rana verde (1960) as Conde de la Mota
 Compadece al delincuente (1960)
 Culpables (1960) as Amigo #2
 El hombre de la isla (1960) as Médico
 Mi último tango (1960)
 Ursus (1961)
 Adiós, Mimí Pompón (1961)
 Goliath Against the Giants (1961)
 El secreto de los hombres azules (1961)
 Fantasmas en la casa (1961) as Recepcionista
 Margarita se llama mi amor (1961)
 Los dos golfillos (1961)
 Tres de la Cruz Roja (1961)
 Rosa de Lima (1961)
 Kilómetro 12 (1961)
 Salto mortal (1962)
 La mentira tiene cabellos rojos (1962) as Fraile
 Abuelita Charlestón (1962)
 Teresa de Jesús (1962)
 Historia de una noche (1962) as Maître
 Accidente 703 (1962)
 Mentirosa (1962)
 Escuela de seductoras (1962)
 I tromboni di Fra Diavolo (1962)
 Vuelve San Valentín (1962)
 Cupido contrabandista (1962) as Instructor de motos
 Atraco a las tres (1962)
 La gran familia (1962)
 Shades of Zorro (1962) as Cochero
 Perseus Against the Monsters (1963) (uncredited)
 Plaza de oriente (1963)
 The Castilian (1963)
 Implacable Three (1963) as Sanders
 La pandilla de los once (1963)
 Gunfight in the Red Sands (1963) as Poker Player
 Ensayo general para la muerte (1963)
 Objetivo: las estrellas (1963)
 Eva 63 (1963) as Amigo de Miguel
 La chica del gato (1964) as Jefe de estación
 The Spy (1964)
 El escándalo (1964)
 Three Ruthless Ones (1964) as Membro del jurado
 Tengo 17 años (1964) as Don Jorge inspector jefe (uncredited)
 Apache Fury (1964) as Banquero
 Black Angel of the Mississippi (1964) as Banquero
 Fin de semana (1964)
 Doomed Fort (1964) as Juez militar
 El salario del crimen (1964)
 Rueda de sospechosos (1964) as José
 Cavalry Charge (1964)
 Miguelín (1965)
 Murieta (1965) (uncredited)
 Seven Hours of Gunfire (1965) as Padre de Bill
 Shoot to Kill (1965) as Davy, Bartender
 Whisky y vodka (1965)
 Espionage in Tangiers (1965) as Hotel Clerk
 Fall of the Mohicans (1965) as Doctor
 Hands of a Gunfighter (1965) as Tendero
 Misión especial en Caracas (1965)
 Mi canción es para ti (1965)
 In a Colt's Shadow (1965) as Gambler (uncredited)
 Operación Póker: agente 05-14 (1965) as British Intelligence Chief (uncredited)
 La escalada de la muerte (1965) as Hombre de la maleta
 Las últimas horas... (1966)
 Con el viento solano (1966) as Eduardo
 Operación Lady Chaplin (1966) as Doctor (uncredited)
 Huida en la frontera (1966) as Police chief
 Django Does Not Forgive (1966)
 A Bullet for the General (1967) as Capt. Enrique Sanchez Compoy (uncredited)
 Dinamita Joe (1967) as Soldier (uncredited)
 Ultimate Gunfighter (1967) as Senor Pedro Campos
 Dos alas (1967)
 I'll Kill Him and Return Alone (1967) as Ciudadano (uncredited)
 Las cicatrices (1967)
 Club de solteros (1967)
 If One Is Born a Swine (1967)
 God Forgives... I Don't! (1967) as Old Mexican in Taverna
 Camino de la verdad (1968)
 Go for Broke (1968) as Jack, Townsman (uncredited)
 White Comanche (1968) as Barman (uncredited)
 One by One (1968) as Sheriff in First Scene (uncredited)
 Crime Story (1968) as The General
 Camino de la verdad (1968)
 La batalla del último Panzer (1969)
 Death on High Mountain (1969)
 Adiós cordera (1969)
 Siete minutos para morir (1969) as Dueño albergue
 The Avenger, Zorro (1969) as Banker (uncredited)
 El apartamento de la tentación (1971)
 Dead Men Ride (1971) as Sheriff (uncredited)
 El bandido Malpelo (1971)
 La montaña rebelde (1971)
 Alta tensión (1972)
 Tombs of the Blind Dead (1972) as Inspector Oliveira
 Prey of Vultures (1972) as Townsman (uncredited)
 Secuestro a la española (1972)
 Im Auftrag von Madame (1973, TV Series) as Fellini
 La descarriada (1973)
 Los gozos y las sombras (1982, TV Series) as El Juez (final appearance)

References

Bibliography

External links
 

1902 births
1981 deaths
Spanish male film actors
Spanish male television actors
20th-century Spanish male actors
Male Spaghetti Western actors